Hurricane Felix was an extremely powerful Category 5 Atlantic hurricane which was the southernmost-landfalling Category 5 storm on record, surpassing Hurricane Edith of 1971. It was the sixth named storm, second hurricane, and second Category 5 hurricane of the 2007 Atlantic hurricane season. Felix formed from a tropical wave on August 31, passing through the southern Windward Islands on September 1 before strengthening to attain hurricane status. On the next day, Felix rapidly strengthened into a major hurricane, and early on September 3 it was upgraded to Category 5 status; at 2100 UTC on the same day, the hurricane was downgraded to Category 4 status, but strengthened into a Category 5 hurricane for the second and final time by the morning of September 4.

On September 4, Felix made landfall just south of the border between Nicaragua and Honduras, causing at least 133 deaths and hundreds of millions of dollars in damages in Central America. Because of its devastating impact on Central America, especially on Nicaragua, its name was retired after the 2007 season.

Meteorological history

Initially difficult to locate on satellites, the wave axis tracked through a moist environment and developed an area of scattered thunderstorms. By August 25 visible satellite imagery indicated broad cyclonic turning just north of the Intertropical Convergence Zone. The wave continued to develop moderate to strong convection, and on August 27 a 1012 mbar (hPa; 29.88 inHg) low pressure area developed about 830 mi (1,340 km) west-southwest of Praia, Cape Verde. For the next several days the system failed to organize significantly; however, on August 30 the wave became better defined with more representation of the cyclonic turning into the low.

Upon becoming a tropical cyclone, the depression was located to the south of a strong ridge, resulting in a west-northwest motion. The system maintained curved rainbands with expanding outflow, and with light wind shear and warm water temperatures the environment favored further development. Its deep convection consolidated very near the center, and shortly after passing over the island of Grenada the depression intensified into Tropical Storm Felix early at around 0900 UTC on September 1. Felix quickly strengthened as it developed a small inner core of convection with tightly wound bands around the center, and by late on September 1 an eye feature was observed on satellite imagery.

Tracking through an area of extremely low wind shear and increasingly high oceanic heat content, Felix quickly developed a well-defined eye, a symmetric cloud structure, and strong upper-level outflow; consequently, the hurricane commenced explosive intensification shortly afterward. This also makes Felix the second-fastest intensifying Atlantic hurricane on record, just behind Wilma 2 years prior. While investigating the hurricane, Hurricane Hunters encountered extreme turbulence and potentially dangerous graupel, which forced the flight to abort the mission.

Initially, Felix was predicted to track west-northwestward, striking Belize before crossing the Yucatán Peninsula; however, its path remained nearly due westward. On September 4, Felix had completed an eyewall replacement cycle and began strengthening again during the day. Felix was upgraded to a Category 5 for the second time at 1040 UTC, and made landfall in Nicaragua just south of its border with Honduras, in the Mosquito Coast region, as a Category 5 hurricane with  winds. Hurricane Felix struck Nicaragua on the same day as Hurricane Henriette struck the Baja California Peninsula in the eastern Pacific Ocean, which marked the second recorded occurrence that a North Atlantic hurricane and a Pacific hurricane made landfall on the same day; the previous occurrence was on August 23, 1992, when Hurricane Andrew hit the Bahamas on the same day Hurricane Lester hit Mexico's Baja California Peninsula. By nine hours after moving ashore, the system maintained a well-organized cloud pattern and intense rainbands, although the winds rapidly decreased; early on September 5 Felix weakened to a tropical storm as its upper-level circulation became detached from the low-level portion. The system deteriorated to a tropical depression as it crossed into southern Honduras, and at 0900 UTC the National Hurricane Center issued the last advisory on Felix as it began degenerating into a broad low pressure area. The remnants of Felix tracked west-northwestward over other portions of Latin America, and eventually dissipated over the Mexican state of Tabasco on September 7.

Preparations

Upon Felix's becoming a tropical cyclone, a tropical storm warning was issued for Saint Vincent and the Grenadines, Tobago, and Grenada and its dependencies; a tropical storm watch was also issued for the northeastern Venezuela coast from Cumaná to Pedernales, including Isla Margarita, as well as the ABC islands. The National Emergency Management Agency of Tobago was fully activated, with 79 shelters opened on the island. Coinciding with the upgrade of Felix to tropical storm status, the watch for the ABC islands was upgraded to a tropical storm warning. A hurricane watch was added to the islands early on September 2, where several tourists attempted to leave by plane prior to the arrival of the storm. Early on September 2, the government of Jamaica issued a tropical storm watch for the island, which was canceled as the hurricane passed far to its south. Later on September 2, a tropical storm watch was issued for Grand Cayman, and the next day a tropical storm warning was put in place on Providencia Island. A hurricane watch was issued for the Caribbean coast of Guatemala and the entire coastline of Belize at 1200 UTC on September 3.

At 0300 UTC on September 3, the government of Honduras issued a hurricane watch from Limón to the Honduras/Nicaragua border, which was upgraded to a hurricane warning six hours later. At the same time, a hurricane watch was extended westward to the Honduras/Guatemala border, and early on September 4 a tropical storm warning was put in place for the same region. Officials ordered evacuations for citizens in low-lying areas near the coastline; by midday on September 3, around 300 tourists evacuated from the Bay Islands department, with an additional 400 preparing to leave by plane; approximately 2,000 people were evacuated from coastal areas. By the time the hurricane made landfall, about 20,000 people in Honduras left for safer areas.

At 1500 UTC on September 3, about 21 hours before its final landfall, the government of Nicaragua issued a hurricane warning from Puerto Cabezas northward to the national border. About 12 hours before landfall, a tropical storm warning was issued from Puerto Cabezas southward to Prinzapolka. Prior to the arrival of the hurricane, officials sent about 140,000 lbs (63,000 kg) of meals and emergency supplies to near the landfall location.

Impact

Caribbean Islands

The storm produced heavy rainfall across the Windward Islands. On Trinidad, heavy precipitation caused mudslides and overflown rivers which destroyed some bridges; moderate winds damaged several buildings on the island. Damage on neighboring Tobago was concentrated on its northern portion, where several mudslides resulted from the rainfall; monetary damage on Tobago was estimated at $250,000 (2007 TTD; $40,000 2007 USD$,   USD). Felix produced gusty winds on Grenada, which downed several power lines and destroyed the roofs of two houses; rough waves also broke several vessels from their anchors. In St. Lucia, winds from the storm damaged the roof of a store in Castries, which collapsed and destroyed 12 vehicles.

In the ABC islands, the hurricane resulted in gusty winds and heavy rainfall. However, little damage was reported in Bonaire; the precipitation left several homes submerged under water in Curaçao. In Aruba, the winds damaged one house and briefly left a northern town without power. Hurricane Felix produced strong winds and  waves along the north coast of Venezuela, which left one person missing in Puerto Cabello.

Central America

Early reports suggest severe damage in Honduras and Nicaragua after Felix made landfall as a Category 5 hurricane. In Puerto Cabezas, nearly every structure sustained at least roof damage, and many buildings were destroyed. Along the Mosquito Coast, flooding and mudslides were reported, destroying many houses and blocking highways. The government of Nicaragua declared the northern Caribbean coast a disaster area. Hurricane Felix had not yet made landfall but reached maximum force when it passed over the Miskito Cays. Pillars that previously formed the base of the houses were the only remains on the Cays.

At least 133 people were reported dead. At least 130 of them were in Nicaragua. While few details have been disclosed, they include at least 25 dead Miskito fishermen swept away, a drowning death on a boat, impact from a fallen tree and at least one indirect death caused by medical complications after birth. There were three deaths reported in Honduras, one of which was caused by a motor vehicle accident caused by heavy rain and landslides, and two caused by flooding in the capital city of Tegucigalpa. However, hundreds of others were missing (mostly at sea), and communication was difficult to impossible in many areas. Some survivors were also found on the Mosquito Coast who were initially reported missing.

According to official information, at least 40,000 people were affected and 9,000 houses destroyed, most of them in the Nicaraguan city of Bilwi (Puerto Cabezas), where a "State of Disaster" was decreed by the government. A total lack of supplies and services were also reported in the area. The response was almost immediate. Help from Venezuela, Cuba, the United States, and Honduras was received, and a lot of organizations, such as the Nicaraguan Red Cross, the media and universities organized collections all over the country. Nicaraguan President Daniel Ortega visited Bilwi on the day after the catastrophe and promised the reconstruction of houses to the people affected. Damage in Nicaragua totaled 13.4 billion (2007 NIO; $716.3 million 2007 USD$,   USD).

Inland flooding was also reported in Honduras, particularly near Tegucigalpa and in the northwestern regions where the Ulua River and the Chamelecon River overflowed into an agricultural area. Coastal flooding also damages the town of Izabal in Guatemala where 850 people were evacuated. Crop damage in Honduras amounted to L68.28 million (2007 HNL; $3.64 million 2007 USD$,   USD).

Aftermath
After Felix, over 160,000 people were suffering as many communities were stranded due to the storm. An appeal was given out by the United Nations for over $48 million (2007 USD$,   USD) in emergency aid to the hard-hit areas, particularly in Nicaragua. The appeal United States federal government delivered over $1.17 million (2007 USD$,   USD) in assistance, and the European Union responded with a donation of €1 million euros ($1.36 million 2007 USD$,   USD). The United States Agency for International Development (USAID) and the Office of Foreign Disaster Assistance (OFDA) airlifted 120 rolls of plastic sheeting to the severely affected areas, which was used to repair the damaged roofs of health clinics and schools. USAID and OFDA also distributed 12,000 ten-liter water containers to Puerto Cabezas. Emergency relief supplies from both USAID and OFDA totaled to $94,190 (2007 USD$,   USD). In the aftermath of both Hurricane Dean and Felix, combined, USAID and OFDA donated $25,000 (2007 USD$,   USD) in aid to Honduras, and $1.2 million (2007 USD$,   USD) to Nicaragua. In addition, United States Department of Defense (USDOD) gave $1.5 million (2007 USD$,   USD) in humanitarian assistance to Nicaragua. In collaboration with USAID and OFDA, the USDOD delivered near 27.55 tons (25 metric tons) of food from the United Nation's World Food Program to the North Caribbean Coast Autonomous Region, Nicaragua.

Retirement

Due to the extensive damage and high death toll from Felix in Nicaragua, the name was officially retired on May 13, 2008, by the World Meteorological Organization during its annual meeting in Orlando, Florida, and will never be used again for any future Atlantic hurricanes. It was replaced by Fernand on List V of the Atlantic hurricane naming lists, which was used in the 2013 Atlantic hurricane season.

See also

 Tropical cyclones in 2007
 List of Category 5 Atlantic hurricanes
 Timeline of the 2007 Atlantic hurricane season
 Hurricane Matthew (2016) – Similar storm and lowest latitude Category 5 Atlantic hurricane on record
 Hurricane Eta (2020) – A deadly Category 4 hurricane that impacted similar areas
 Hurricane Iota (2020) – A Category 4 hurricane that impacted similar areas

References

External links

 NHC report on Hurricane Felix
 NHC archive on Hurricane Felix.
 archive on Hurricane Felix.
 Tropical Cyclones University of Wisconsin–Madison
 Video from the eye of Hurricane Felix

2007 Atlantic hurricane season
Hurricanes in Venezuela
Hurricanes in Nicaragua
Hurricanes in Honduras
Hurricanes in El Salvador
Hurricanes in Guatemala
Category 5 Atlantic hurricanes
Retired Atlantic hurricanes
Hurricane Felix
Hurricane Felix
Hurricane Felix
Hurricane Felix
Hurricane Felix
Hurricanes in the ABC Islands
Felix